Zabihollah Safa (May 7, 1911 in Shahmirzad, Iran – April 29, 1999 in Lübeck, Germany) was a scholar and professor Emeritus of Iranian Studies at the University of Tehran.

His main contribution to the field of Iranian studies is seen in his seminal and comprehensive works on the history of Persian literature. He was also a regular contributor to the Encyclopaedia Iranica.

Education and professional life

Awards 

Z. Safa has won several awards: a.o. Decoration (medal) for Science (1. class) (Cultural Ministry (1936), Nešān-e Sepās, 1. class (1947), Palmes Académiques Rang Commandeur (French Government) (1970), Neshān-e Tāj (1977), Ehsan Yarshater prize (1997)

Bibliography

Persian literature 

 Hamâse-sarâyi dar Irân, Tehran 1945 (2000)
 Târikh-e tahawwol-e Nazm-o- Nasr-e Pârsi, 1952 (1331), 8. ed. 1974 (1353),
 Ayên-e sokhan. Dar ma’âni wa bayân, Tehran 1952 (1959), 18. ed. 1994
 Târikh-e adabiyyât dar Irân, Tehran 1953, 16. ed. 2001 8 vol.
 Gandj-e Sokhan, 1370 pages, 1968 (1348), ed. 1976 (1355), Tehran, 1995 3 vol.
 Gandjine-je Sokhan, 1969 (1348), 3. ed. 1974 (1353), ?. ed. 1983, Tehran, 6 vol.
 Gandj va Gandjine, Tehran 2002

Persian history and history of thought and science 

 Gâh-shomari wa Djashn-hâ-je Melli –je Irâniân, 1933 -1976 (1312–1355))
 Dânesh-ha-ye Iunâni dar Shâhanshâhi-ye Sâssâni, 1952 (1331) Tehran
 Mazdâ-Parast-i dar Irân-e Ghadim, 1957 (1336), 3. ed. 1978 (1357) (2537)
 Târikh’e olum’e aghli dar tammaddon’e eslami ta awwasate gharne panjom, Tehran, 1952 (1977)
 Târikh-e Oulum wa Adabiyyât-e Irâni
 Moghâddem-e-ï bar Tassâwof, 1975 (1354), 4 ed. 1976 (1355), Tehran
 Nazar-i beh Târikh-e Hekmat wa Oulum dar Irân, 1976 (1355), Tehran
 Âmuseshgâh-ha wa Âmusesh-hâ dar Irân, 1975 (1354), Tehran
 Dur-namâ-ï as Farhang-e Irâni wa Assar-e Djahâni-ye Ân, 1971 (1350), Tehran
 Khollasseh-ye Târikhe Siyâssi wa Edjtemâï dar Irân, 2. ed. 1978 (1357), Tehran
 Siri dar Târikh-e Sabân –hâ wa Addab-e Irâni, 1976 (1355) Tehran
 Niki-nâmeh, 1971 (1350), Tehran
 Âyin-e Shâh-han-shâhi-ye Irân, 1967 (1346), Tehran
 Târikh-e Shâhanshâhi-ye Irân wa Maghâm-e Manawi-e Ân, 1975 (1354), Tehran
 Shâhanshah dar Târikh wa Addab-e Irâni

Editorials and works on specific historic personalities 

 Ayyuqi (Poet of the 5th century/isl.): Warqa o Golshâh, Edition with Introduction, Glossary and Appendix. 1964 Tehran, (This novel written in verses was translated into the French language by Souren Melikian (In: Arts Asiatiques Tome XXII. Numéro Spécial. in 1970) after being published in Iran. (Remark by Z. Safa in his handwritten CV)
 Djashn-nâmeh-je Ebn-e Sinâ(3 volumes), vol 1: 1952 (1331), vol 2: 1955 (1334), vol. 3: 1956 (1335), Teheran
 Yâd-Nâmeh-ye Kh. Tussi(Congress Teheran 1957 (1336))
 Diwân-e Abdul-Wâse’ Djebli, 1960 (1339), 2. ed. 1977 (1356), Tehran
 Dârâb-nâmeh-je Bigami (or Firuznâmeh) 2 volumes, vol 1: 1960, (1339), vol 2: 1962 (1341) (both issues reprinted in 2003) Unesco - Translation into Englisch
 Diwân-e Saïfu’d-din e Mohammade Farghâni, 1962 (1341), 3. ed. 1965 (1344), 3 volumes
 Dârâb-nâmeh-je Tarsussi, 2 volumes, vol. 1: 1965 (1344), 2. ed. 1977 (1356), vol 2: 1967, 2. ed. 1977 (1356), Tehran
 Bakhtiârnâmeh, 1966 (1345)
 Ahwâl wa Assâr-e Abu Reihân-e Biruni, 1973 (1352), Tehran
 Dalirân-e Djânbâs, 1976 (1355), Tehran, 467 pages
 Bahrâm-e Tshubin
 Rostam wa Esfandijâr(Rostam and Esfandiar – Heroes of the Shâhnâmeh
 Tshâhar Maghâleh
 Hakim-e Fârâb, 1974 (1353), Tehran

Works published in French 

 Le livre du Millénaire d’Avicenne, 1953 (1332)
 Anthologie de la poésie persane, Paris, Gallimard Unesco, 1964, ?. ed. 2003
 Un aperçu sur l’évolution de la pensée à travers la poésie persane, 1969 (1348), Tehran
 Al-Biruni, ses oeuvres et ses pensées, 1973 (1352), Teheran
 Djalal al-Din Mawlavi, grand penseur et poète persan 1974 (1353), Tehran
 La prose rythmique persane (Asiathèque, 1976)
 Comparaison des origines et des sources des deux contes persans:“Leyli et Madjnoun“ de Nizami et „Varqah et Golchah“ de Ayouqi, Accademia Nazionale die Lincei, Roma, 1977

Translations into the Persian language 

 Marg-e Soghrât, (La mort de Socrate, Lamartine) 1935 (1314), 3.ed. 1968 (1347), Tehran
 Râfâël, (Raphael, Lamartine) 1938 (1317), 5. ed. 1978 (1357), Tehran
 Leibnitz, Mehr, 2. ed. 1949 (1328)
 Kayâniân, 1957 (1336), 4. ed. 1976 (1355), Translation of the Danish scholar Arthur Christensens: ‚Les Kayanides’

Own poetry 

 Nas’at-e Djâm, 1976 (1355) (2535), Teheran

Literature (selection) 

 Iranshenasi. Papers in Honour of Professor Zabihollah Safa.  Vol.III, No. 1, Rockville, Maryland, USA Spring 1991
 Iranshenasi. Commemorative Issue for Zabihollah Safa (1911–1999).  Vol.XI, No. 3, Rockville, Maryland, USA Autumn 1999
 Djalal Khaleghi Motlagh: "Zabihollah Safa und sein Werk". (Zabihollah Safa and his works). In: Iranzamin, Bonn 1991, 1
 Seyfeddin Najmabadi: "Ein Nachruf auf Professor Zabihollah Safa". (Obituary for Professor Zabihollah Safa) In: Orient 4/2000, Hamburg, S. 528ff.
 Mohammad Torabi. Djaschn-nâmeh-ye Ostâd Zabihollâh Safâ (Honorary issue for Professor Zabihollah Safa). Nasr'e Shâhâb, Teheran 19

Quotes on Zabihollah Safa 

 "The most outstanding historian of Persian literature" (BBC, Persian 11 November 1999)
 "One of the most eminent and productive Persian scholars of our time and a Consulting Editor and regular contributor to the Encyclopaedia Iranica" (Newsletter of the Center for Iranian Studies, Melac, Vol 11, No 1, Columbia University, New York, Spring 1999)
 "An Eternal Name in the History of Persian Literature. " (Ehsan Yarshater lecutreship prize signature, 1997)

See also 

 Iranian Studies
 Persian literature

Iranian Iranologists
20th-century Iranian historians
Iranian literary scholars
Academic staff of the University of Tehran
1911 births
1999 deaths
Members of the Academy of Persian Language and Literature
20th-century Iranian poets